Southeast Minahasa Regency is a regency in North Sulawesi, Indonesia. Its capital is Ratahan. It covers an area of 710.83 km2, and had a population of 100,443 at the 2010 Census; this had risen to 116,323 at the 2020 Census. It was established as a separate regency from part of the South Minahasa Regency on 2 January 2007. Its administrative centre is at Ratahan.

Administrative Districts 
The regency is divided into twelve districts (kecamatan), tabulated below with their areas and their populations at the 2010 Census and the 2020 Census. The table also includes the district administrative centres.

Climate
Ratahan, the seat of the regency has a tropical rainforest climate (Af) moderate rainfall in August and September and heavy rainfall in the remaining months.

References

Regencies of North Sulawesi